Invented and founded by John R. Armstrong then sold to Scott Ginsberg in 1993, Digital Generation Systems, Inc. (commonly referred to as DG) was the very first National online service platform in the world. DG provided digital media commercial distribution services to the advertising, entertainment and broadcast industries with an online media distribution network used by advertisers and agencies, and online radio, television, cable, network and print publishing destinations.  On February 7, 2014, DG's TV advertising business was acquired by Extreme Reach, Inc. and its online advertising business was spun off into the new company Sizmek, Inc.

History
April 15, 2005—DG Systems, Inc. (Nasdaq: DGIT), the leading provider of digital media distribution services to the advertising and broadcast industries, today announced it has acquired the assets of Media DVX, a subsidiary of the Lenfest Media Group (LMG), for $10 million.

DG temporarily changed its handle to DG FastChannel when DG Systems and FastChannel Networks merged in 2006.

DG Systems initially used POTs to distribute later adding web-based and satellite technology for advertising content distribution thereby all but eliminating the need for reel to reel audio tape and CDs for radio station spot distribution. Later the system replaced the need for videotape distribution for television. DG Systems created a hybrid system that allowed for content delivery through either the satellite distribution system or through the Internet.

FastChannel Networks used the Internet for delivery of content. FastChannel Networks created a Web-based interface for developing, managing and delivering advertising content. Using the Web, post houses, advertisers and agencies were able to collaborate, manage and distribute advertising content through an online application.

In 2009, DG was ranked fifth on the Fortune Small Business list of the US' 100 Fastest Growing Small Public Companies. It also ranked fifth on the 2009 Fortune Fastest Growing Companies in the World listing.

In 2011, DG began buying up digital ad serving technologies in the online space, specifically focused on Rich Media vendors with global reach. Such companies include Mediamind Technologies, EyeWonder and the Unicast platform.

In 2011, DG was responsible for the first second-screen ad being served in connection with Channel 4's Million Pound Drop TV game show. The second screen ad format was watched by 20% of the online playing audience according to Dean Donaldson, Global Head of Media Innovation.

In August 2013, DG agreed to spin off their online ad tech operations (branded as DG MediaMind and consisting of the merged operations of the former MediaMind, EyeWonder, Unicast, Peer39, and Republic Project) into a new company named Sizmek, Inc. and to sell their remaining operations to Extreme Reach in a deal valued at $485 million. The money was used to pay off all of DG's debt and to fund a $3/share dividend to shareholders. All of DG's cash and working capital was then transferred to Sizmek and Extreme Reach acquired the remaining operations. The deal closed on February 7, 2014.

In March 2019, Sizmek has filed for Chapter 11 bankruptcy.

Network Reach
DG soon moved its headquarters to Irving, Texas. Regional offices included New York, Chicago, Los Angeles, San Francisco, Boca Raton, Atlanta, Dallas, Detroit, Louisville, Toronto, London, and Herzliya in Israel.

In 2011, MediaMind, the online division of DG at the time, was the second largest online ad Server behind Google, reaching 700 million unique users, as accredited by the Media Rating Council.

References

External links
CNN Money, Fortune 500 Listing 

Companies based in Irving, Texas
Companies disestablished in 2014